Sebastiania jaliscensis is a species of flowering plant in the family Euphorbiaceae. It was described in 1961. It is native to southwestern Mexico.

References

Plants described in 1961
Flora of Mexico
jaliscensis